I Am Canada  is a series of Canadian historical novels marketed at older boys, with the first book being published in September 2010. The series is written by a variety of Canadian authors and is published by Scholastic Canada Ltd.

The books are a mixture of fact and fiction, including actual maps, documents and photographs alongside first-person narratives. The stories are set all over the world, showing the involvement of Canadians in world events as well as the history of Canada.

Books
Blood and Iron: Building the Railway, Lee Heen-gwong, British Columbia, 1882 by Paul Yee (2010)
Prisoner of Dieppe: World War II, Alistair Morrison, Occupied France, 1942 by Hugh Brewster (2010)
Shot at Dawn: World War I, Allan McBride, France, 1917 by John Wilson (2011)
Deadly Voyage: RMS Titanic, Jamie Laidlaw, April 14, 1912 by Hugh Brewster (2011)
Behind Enemy Lines: World War II, Sam Frederiksen, Nazi-Occupied Europe, 1944 by Carol Matas (2012)
A Call to Battle: War of 1812, Alexander MacKay, Upper Canada, 1812 by Gillian Chan (2012)
Storm the Fortress: The Siege of Quebec, William Jenkins, New France, 1759 by Maxine Trottier (2013)
Fire in the Sky: World War I, Paul Townend, Over No Man's Land, 1916 by David Ward (2013)
Graves of Ice: The Lost Franklin Expedition, George Chambers, The Northwest Passage, 1845 by John Wilson (2014)
Sink and Destroy: The Battle of the Atlantic, Bill O'Connell, North Atlantic, 1940 by Edward Kay (2014)
Defend or Die: The Siege of Hong Kong, Jack Finnigan, Hong Kong, 1941 by Gillian Chan (2015)
Brothers in Arms: The Siege of Louisbourg, Sébastien de L'Espérance, New France, 1758 by Don Aker (2015)
Sniper Fire: The Fight for Ortona, Paul Baldassara, Italy, 1943 by Jonathan Webb (2016)

See also

Dear Canada
My Name is America
My Australian Story
My Story
History of Canada

External links
 I Am Canada website

Young adult novel series
Canadian children's novels
Canadian historical novels
Children's historical novels